Javel may refer to:
 Javel, Paris, a neighborhood of Paris
 Javel – André Citroën (Paris Métro)
 Gare de Javel, train station in the 15th arrondissement of Paris, by the Pont Mirabeau

See also
 Eau de Javel, literally "Javel water" or Sodium hypochlorite (known in English as bleach), product named after a quarter in Paris where it was produced